Olympic beach may refer to:

 Olympiaki Akti, a coastal resort near Katerini, Greece
 List of Olympic Games beach venues, any one of a number of beach venues used during the Olympic Games

See also